Domagoj is a Croatian name of Slavic origin derived from the Slavic elements dom ("home") and goj ("grow, breed, foster, nurture"). Notable people with the name include:

Domagoj of Croatia, a duke (knez) of Dalmatian Croatia in 864–876
Domagoj Abramović, Croatian footballer
Domagoj Antolić, Croatian footballer
Domagoj Bošnjak, Croatian basketball player
Domagoj Bradarić, Croatian footballer
Domagoj Duvnjak, Croatian handball player
Domagoj Franić (born 1993), Croatian footballer
Domagoj Kapec, Croatian ice hockey player
Domagoj Kapetanović, Croatian footballer and manager
Domagoj Pavičić, Croatian footballer
Domagoj Pušić, Croatian footballer
Domagoj Vida, Croatian footballer

See also
 
 House of Domagojević

References

Croatian masculine given names